David Bennington Weatherhead (19 February 1928 – 25 March 2012) was a Canadian lawyer, barrister and politician. Weatherhead  was a Liberal party member of the House of Commons of Canada.

He represented the Ontario riding of Scarborough West on two occasions, for the 28th Canadian Parliament where he won in the 1968 federal election, and for the 32nd Parliament where he won the 1980 election. Weatherhead was defeated after each of these Parliamentary terms. He died in 2012.

External links

 

1928 births
2012 deaths
Liberal Party of Canada MPs
Members of the House of Commons of Canada from Ontario
Politicians from Toronto